The western dwarf girdled lizard (Cordylus minor) is a species of lizard in the family Cordylidae. It is a small, spiny lizard found in South Africa.

References

Cordylus
Endemic reptiles of South Africa
Reptiles described in 1943
Taxa named by Vivian Frederick Maynard FitzSimons